BMY-14802, also known as BMS-181100, is a drug with antipsychotic effects which acts as both a sigma receptor antagonist and a 5-HT1A receptor agonist. It also has affinity for the 5-HT2 and D4 receptors. The drug reached phase III clinical trials for the treatment of psychosis but was never marketed.

See also
 Enciprazine
 Ensaculin
 Mafoprazine
 Azaperone
 Fluanisone

References

Abandoned drugs
Secondary alcohols
Organofluorides
Piperazines
Aminopyrimidines
Serotonin receptor antagonists
Serotonin receptor agonists
Sigma antagonists